Maha Prachandaru is a 1981 Indian Kannada-language heist film, directed by Joe Simon and produced by R. Thimmaiah, M. Krishna, Revanna and Shantha S. Karmore. The film stars Vishnuvardhan, Ambareesh, Kumari Vinaya and Halam in lead roles. The film had musical score by Upendra Kumar. The movie is based on novel Vigraha Choraru by Vijay Sasanur. The concept of the movie was later used in the 2008 film Navagraha.

Plot

In the movie, the idol stealing gang tries to involve Vishnuvarshan but he gives the idol back to the temple from which they stole after plotting from a long time. The final fight between themselves sees Vishnuvardhan going back to the temple head's daughter who is a worshipper of the God and she would have died due to his betrayal but his love was real. Ambareesh (her brother) arrests Vishnuvardhan who accepts it as he is guilty of betraying her more than he stealing the idol.

Cast

Vishnuvardhan
Ambareesh
Kumari Vinaya
Halam
Tiger Prabhakar
Sudheer
Dinesh
Musuri Krishnamurthy
Chethan Ramrao
Hanumanthachar
Bangalore Nagesh
Jr. Narasimharaju
Mysore Lokesh
Thipatur Siddaramaiah
Kunigal Ramanath

Soundtrack
The music was composed by Upendra Kumar.

References

External links
 
 

1981 films
1980s Kannada-language films
Films scored by Upendra Kumar